Max Douy (June 20, 1913 – July 2, 2007) was a French art director.

Selected filmography
 The Rules of the Game (1939)
 There's No Tomorrow (1939)
 The Trump Card (1942)
 Goodbye Leonard (1943)
 Paris Frills (1945)
 The Perfume of the Lady in Black (1949)
 Without Leaving an Address (1951)
 Matrimonial Agency (1952)
 Good Lord Without Confession (1953)
 A Woman in White (1965)
 Gloria (1977)
 The Roaring Forties (1982)

References

Bibliography
 Hayward, Susan. French Costume Drama of the 1950s: Fashioning Politics in Film. Intellect Books, 2010.

External links

1913 births
2007 deaths
French art directors